Sierndorf is a town in the district of Korneuburg in the Austrian state of Lower Austria.

Population

References

Cities and towns in Korneuburg District